Jayaben Vajubhai Shah  was an Indian politician and a member of the Indian National Congress political party. She was elected to the Lok Sabha, lower house of the Parliament of India in 1957 from Girnar in Bombay State and in 1962 and 1967 from Amreli in Gujarat.

References

External links
 Official biographical sketch in Parliament of India website

1922 births
2014 deaths
India MPs 1957–1962
India MPs 1962–1967
India MPs 1967–1970
Lok Sabha members from Gujarat
People from Bhavnagar
Indian National Congress politicians
Indian National Congress politicians from Gujarat